Nicolás de la Torre Muñoz (1589 – 4 July 1653) was a Roman Catholic prelate who served as Bishop of Santiago de Cuba (1649–1653).

Biography
Nicolás de la Torre Muñoz was born in México in 1589.
On 13 September 1649, he was appointed during the papacy of Pope Innocent X as Bishop of Santiago de Cuba.
On 19 February 1651, he was consecrated bishop by Miguel de Poblete Casasola, Archbishop of Manila, assisted by Father Pedro de Barrientos Lomelin. 
He served as Bishop of Santiago de Cuba until his death on 4 July 1653. 
While a priest, he assisted in the consecration of Diego de Guevara y Estrada, Archbishop of Santo Domingo (1642).

References

External links and additional sources
 (for Chronology of Bishops)  
 (for Chronology of Bishops) 

17th-century Roman Catholic bishops in Cuba
Bishops appointed by Pope Innocent X
1589 births
1653 deaths
Roman Catholic bishops of Santiago de Cuba